Leon Pitchaya James (born 29 August 2001) is a professional footballer born and raised in England who plays as a midfielder for Thai League 1 club Nongbua Pitchaya. Born in England, he represents Thailand at youth level. 

James spent 12 years playing for Leicester City being the first ever Thailand national to sign a scholarship in England. He competed in various competitions, reaching the quarter finals of the FA Youth Cup, before deciding to part ways with Leicester City to move to Thailand to sign his first professional contract for Thai Premier League club Ratchaburi Mitr Phol. James made an appearance in the Chang FA Cup.

James signed his 2nd contract in Thailand for Sukhothai.

Club career

Leicester City
James joined the Leicester City academy at age six, and progressed through the various age groups for the following 11 seasons. In his final year with the club, his under-19 squad reached the quarterfinals of the 2018–19 FA Youth Cup.

Ratchaburi Mitr Phol
In December 2019, James completed a move to Ratchaburi Mitr Phol in the Thai League 1.

Sukhothai
On 4 December 2020, it was announced that James had joined club Sukhothai.

Nongbua Pitchaya
On 1 June 2022, it was announced that James had joined club Nongbua Pitchaya.

International career
In March 2019, James was called up to the Thailand U19 first time for VFF International Tournament. In October 2019, James was in the squad of Thailand U19 for GSB Bangkok Cup 2019, but did not make an appearance.

In December 2022, James was called up to the Thailand U23 national team  for a training camp held from 5–15 December 2022 and for the friendly matches against Laos.

References

External links
 

2001 births
Living people
Leon James
Association football midfielders
Leon James
Leon James
Leon James
Leon James
Leon James
English people of Thai descent
Footballers from Coventry